William John Huard  (born June 24, 1967) is a Canadian former professional ice hockey player. He played in the National Hockey League between 1992 and 1999 with six teams. The rest of his career, which lasted from 1988 to 2000, was spent in different minor leagues.

Career
Huard had a professional career of over 600 games, including parts of seven seasons at the National Hockey League (NHL) with the Boston Bruins, Ottawa Senators, Quebec Nordiques, Dallas Stars, Edmonton Oilers and Los Angeles Kings.

Huard moved to the United Kingdom in 2000 to play in the British Ice Hockey Superleague for the London Knights but left the team after playing just one game to return to Canada to be with his girlfriend who was seven months pregnant at the time.

Personal life
In Huard's hometown of Welland, the local hockey arena has a tribute to his playing career.

One of Huard's sons, Colton, played junior hockey for the Aberdeen Wings in the North American Hockey League.

Career statistics

Regular season and playoffs

References

External links
 

1967 births
Living people
Boston Bruins players
Canadian ice hockey left wingers
Carolina Thunderbirds players
Dallas Stars players
Edmonton Oilers players
Flint Spirits players
Houston Aeros (1994–2013) players
Ice hockey people from Ontario
London Knights (UK) players
Los Angeles Kings players
Lowell Lock Monsters players
Kalamazoo Wings (1974–2000) players
Nashville Knights players
Orlando Solar Bears (IHL) players
Ottawa Senators players
Peterborough Petes (ice hockey) players
Providence Bruins players
Quebec Nordiques players
Sportspeople from Welland
Undrafted National Hockey League players
Utica Devils players